Mortal Thoughts is a 1991 American neo-noir mystery thriller film directed by Alan Rudolph and starring Demi Moore, Glenne Headly, Bruce Willis, John Pankow and Harvey Keitel. Told in narrative flashbacks set in a police interrogation, the film centers on a woman implicated in the violent murder of her friend's abusive, drug-addicted husband. Its title is derived from a quote in William Shakespeare's The Tragedy of Macbeth.

Plot
Cynthia Kellogg is interrogated by Detective John Woods and Detective Linda Nealon at a police station regarding the murder of her husband, Artie. Cynthia provides a deposition, relayed in detailed flashbacks. Cynthia recounts her employment as a hairdresser at her friend Joyce's Bayonne, New Jersey hair salon. Joyce's husband, Jimmy, is a violently abusive drug addict, and Joyce expresses a desire to kill him several times. One night, Cynthia accompanies Joyce and Jimmy to a Feast of Saint Rocco festival. After Jimmy becomes drunk and picks a fight with Joyce, he heads back to their van. Cynthia follows him and takes the keys, leaving him to sleep in the back of the vehicle.

Per Cynthia's account of events, the two women returned to the van later on to find Jimmy dead inside, his throat slashed; Cynthia claims Joyce admitted to cutting his neck after she went to check on him, during which he attacked her. According to Cynthia, at Joyce's insistence, the women disposed of Jimmy's body by dumping it in a ravine. After the murder, Cynthia returns home covered in blood and admits to her husband, Artie, what happened. Several days later, after Jimmy's body is found, Joyce's paranoia about being caught causes her to act increasingly erratically. At one point, she instructs Cynthia to kill one of the hairdressers at the salon out of fear she will tarnish the women's alibis. Joyce subsequently discovers that Artie knows about the murder, and she threatens to Cynthia that she will kill him to silence him. Cynthia does not believe Joyce can actually carry out her threats; however, after Artie is found shot dead at his home on Christmas Eve, Cynthia accuses Joyce.

Throughout Cynthia's interrogation, Detective Woods is skeptical of her descriptions of events and challenges her on them, but ultimately allows her to leave. Cynthia exits the police station, but pauses and recounts the details of what actually happened at the festival: Upon bringing Jimmy to the van, he attempted to rape Cynthia, and began beating her. In self-defense, she slashed his throat with a boxcutter. Cynthia and Joyce left the festival and began driving toward a hospital; however, when Joyce realized he tried to rape Cynthia, she turned the van around and began driving in another direction, biding time while Jimmy bled to death in the back of the van. After he died, the women disposed of his body and made a pact not to tell anyone.

As Cynthia stands outside the police station recalling the truth of what occurred, Joyce is brought inside for her own interrogation. Cynthia decides to re-enter the station, now prepared to tell the truth of her guilt in Jimmy's death. She sits before Detective Woods' camera to record her taped confession.

Cast
 Demi Moore as Cynthia Kellogg
 Glenne Headly as Joyce Urbanski
 Bruce Willis as James "Jimmy" Urbanski
 Harvey Keitel as Detective John Woods
 John Pankow as Arthur "Artie" Kellogg
 Billie Neal as Detective Linda Nealon
 Frank Vincent and Doris McCarthy as Dominic and Jeanette, Joyce's parents
 Karen Shallo as Gloria, James' mother

Production
The film's title is derived from a quote in William Shakespeare's The Tragedy of Macbeth by Lady Macbeth, in which she says: "Come, you spirits / That tend on mortal thoughts, unsex me here, / And fill me from the crown to the toe top-full / Of direst cruelty."

Principal photography of Mortal Thoughts occurred in February 1990. Claude Kerven, who co-wrote the screenplay, was originally hired to direct the project, but was replaced by Alan Rudolph after completing only one week of shooting. The film shoot was partly improvisational, and the conclusion of the film was undetermined until it came time to shoot it. Rudolph recalled: "No one really knew what the ending would be. A half-day before we shot it, we got together and decided what the ending should be."

Star Demi Moore served as a co-producer on the film; according to Rudolph, Moore was aware of the film's budgetary constraints, and took it upon herself to mitigate "the problems we were having."

Release
Mortal Thoughts was scheduled to be released in North America in December 1990, but the release was put on hold. At the time, the production company, Polar Entertainment, had filed a lawsuit against New Visions Pictures for a breach of contract regarding Kerven's replacement, though it is unknown if this was the cause of the release delay. The film opened in the spring, on April 19, 1991.

Box office
The film opened at number 2 at the U.S. box office behind Out for Justice, and earned over $6 million during its opening weekend playing in 963 theaters. Its release expanded the following weekend to 1,196 theaters. It went on to gross a total of $18,784,957 in the United States alone.

Critical response
The film holds a 60% rating on Rotten Tomatoes, based on 15 reviews and grossed $19,018,321 against its $8 million budget.

Audiences polled by CinemaScore gave the film an average grade of "C" on an A+ to F scale.

Accolades

References

External links
 
 
 

1991 films
1990s crime films
1990s mystery films
1990s thriller drama films
1990s English-language films
American mystery films
American neo-noir films
American thriller drama films
Columbia Pictures films
Films about domestic violence
Films scored by Mark Isham
Films directed by Alan Rudolph
Films set in New Jersey
Films shot in New Jersey
1991 drama films
1990s American films